The Washington Huskies football statistical leaders are individual statistical leaders of the Washington Huskies football program in various categories.  The Huskies represent the University of Washington in the NCAA Division I FBS Pac-12 Conference.  Washington's first football season was in 1889.

These lists are dominated by more recent players for several reasons:
 Since 1920s, seasons have increased to 10 or more games.
 The NCAA didn't allow freshmen to play varsity football until 1972 (with the exception of the World War II years), allowing players to have four-year careers.
 In 1975, the Pacific-8 Conference removed a restriction which limited the league's bowl game participation to a single representative tied to the Rose Bowl Game
 The official NCAA record book does not include bowl games in statistical records until 2002, with most colleges also structuring their record books this way.
 Due to COVID-19 issues, the NCAA ruled that the 2020 season would not count against the athletic eligibility of any football player, giving everyone who played in that season the opportunity for five years of eligibility instead of the normal four.

These lists are updated through the end of the 2022 regular season.

Passing

Passing yards

Passing touchdowns

Rushing

Rushing yards

Rushing touchdowns

Receiving

Receptions

Receiving yards

Receiving touchdowns

Total offense
Total offense is the sum of passing and rushing statistics. It does not include receiving or returns.

Washington's record book does not list any leaders in "touchdowns responsible for", the official NCAA term for combined passing and rushing touchdowns.

Total offense yards

Defense

Interceptions

Tackles
Career and season totals since 1967, game totals since 1959.

Sacks
The University provides sack totals since the 1982 season.

Kicking

Field goals made

Field goal percentage
Career with minimum of 25 attempts; season with minimum of 15 attempts. Percentages are displayed with three decimal places, but rankings are based on absolute percentages, taken to as many decimal places as needed to break ties. The second tiebreaker is number of attempts, with higher being better.

See also
 List of Washington Huskies football seasons

References

Washington